The synagogue district of Neuwied with its seat in  Neuwied, Germany, was created by the 1847 Prussian Jews Act. Neuwied is a town in the eponymous county of Neuwied in the north of the state of Rhineland-Palatinate.

In 1864, the municipalities of Heddesdorf and Irlich belonged to the district. In 1894 they were joined by Jews living in Fahr, Hüllenberg, Rockenfeld and Rodenbach.

External links 
 Zur Geschichte der jüdischen Gemeinde Neuwied at Alemannia Judaica

Jewish German history
Religion in Prussia
Neuwied (district)